Ahmet Samim (1884 – 1910) was an Ottoman journalist and liberal politician, who was a founding member of the Ottoman Liberty Party. Despite warnings from his former mentor Süleyman Nesib to stay away from politics, he did not listen and was assassinated in 1910 because of his political views.

References 

1884 births
1910 deaths
People from Prizren
Politicians of the Ottoman Empire
Journalists from the Ottoman Empire